The Men's 200 metres at the 2010 Commonwealth Games as part of the athletics programme was held at the Jawaharlal Nehru Stadium on Saturday 9 October and Sunday 10 October 2010.

Records

Round 1
First 3 in each heat (Q) and 8 best performers (q) advance to the Round 2.

Heat 1

Heat 2

Heat 3

Heat 4

Heat 5

Heat 6

Heat 7

Heat 8

Round 2
First 3 in each heat (Q) and 4 best performers (q) advance to the Semifinals.

Heat 1

Heat 2

Heat 3

Heat 4

Semifinals
First 3 in each heat (Q) and 2 best performers (q) advance to the Final.

Semifinal 1

Semifinal 2

Final

External links
2010 Commonwealth Games - Athletics

Men's 200 metres
2010